is a Japanese title, often used in Japanese martial arts.

Meaning 
The word Shidōin means "instructor" or "teacher" and is typically used as an honorific title to identify an intermediate level instructor within an organization or budo dojo. By comparison, an assistant instructor or teacher would have the title Fuku Shidoin, while a senior instructor would have the title Shihan, meaning "leader", "guide" or "ideal".

Origin 
The word descends from Shido (suru) . It consists of yubi 指 what means finger or sasu 指す which is the verb for showing. Michibiku  means guide or lead. Shido also stands for chivalry, the code of honor of the samurai.

Use 
Different budo arts and dojos have their own requirements for how this title is used, but typically it corresponds to 4th or 5th Dan.

See also 
Japanese honorifics

References 

Titles and rank in Japanese martial arts